"I Can't Believe What You Say (For Seeing What You Do)" is a song written by Ike Turner. It was originally released by Ike & Tina Turner on Kent Records in 1964.

Release 
"I Can't Believe What You Say (For Seeing What You Do)" was written and produced by Ike Turner. It was released as a non-album track on Kent Records in September 1964. The single reached No. 95 on the Billboard Hot 100 and No. 33 on the Record World R&B chart. It was the best-selling R&B record for Kent in 1965. Tina Turner performed the song on Shindig! in August 1965. A different version of the song appeared on Ike & Tina Turner's album Get It – Get It, which was remixed and reissued as Her Man…His Woman in 1971. Ike Turner released another version on the album The Edge in 1980.

Critical reception 
The single was selected for Cash Box magazine's Pick of the Week.

Cash Box (October 10, 1964): "This Kent outing for Ike & Tina Turner is already stirring up a heap of attention. Tagged I Can’t Believe What You Say, it’s a high-speed handclapping twister that sports a host of ultra-commercial vocal and instrumental sounds. Watch it. Backing's a soul-filled shuflle-rock blueser that Tina wails with loads of feeling."

Cover versions 

 1965: Manfred Mann released a version as the B-side to "My Little Red Book" from their album My Little Red Book Of Winners
 1965: British singer Val McKenna released a rendition on Piccadilly Records in the UK
 1967: Danish rock group The Defenders released the song as a single on Sonet Records from their album Looking at You
 1972: Toots and The Maytals released a version on their album Funky Kingston
 2000: Henning Stærk released the song on his album Hit House

Chart performance

References 

1964 songs
1964 singles
Ike & Tina Turner songs
Songs written by Ike Turner
Song recordings produced by Ike Turner
Kent Records singles
Manfred Mann songs
1965 singles
1967 singles
Piccadilly Records singles